Shards of Pol-Pottery: The 2001 Remixes is an EP by Alec Empire and El-P, the title track of which is a re-production of the song "Megaton B-Boy" from the 1999 Handsome Boy Modelling School album So... How's Your Girl?. The EP contains 12 different versions of the songs including remixes, instrumentals and an a cappella.

Track listing

CD (enhanced)
 (Hard Mix)
 (A Capella)
 (Hard Beats)
 (Hard Beats & Voice)
 (Hard Instrumental)
 (String Mix)
 (String Mix Instrumental)
 (String Beats)
 (String Beats & Vocals)
 (No Wave Mix)
 (Generation Star Wars Mix)
 (Black Moon Mix)

Vinyl (12")
 (Hard Mix)
 (A Cappella)
 (Hard Beats)
 (No Wave Mix)
 (String Mix)
 (String Mix Instrumental)
 (String Beats)
 (String Beats & Vocals)

External links
Official Digital Hardcore Recordings site
Alec Empire's official fansite
Shards of Pol-Pottery: The 2001 Remixes (CDE) at Discogs.com
Shards of Pol-Pottery: The 2001 Remixes (12") at Discogs.com

2001 EPs
2001 remix albums
Alec Empire albums
Handsome Boy Modeling School albums
Remix EPs